Agartala Amusement Park was the largest entertainment park in North East India at Amtuli, Agartala, Tripura. As of 2022, the park is closed due to operational reasons.

Amusement parks in India
Defunct amusement parks
Agartala
Year of establishment missing